Hemibagrus chrysops is a species of bagrid catfish found in Malaysia.

References

Eschmeyer, W.N. (ed.), 2003. Catalog of fishes. Updated database version of March 2003. Catalog databases as made available to FishBase in March 2003. 

Bagridae
Fish of Asia
Fish of Malaysia
Taxa named by Heok Hee Ng
Fish described in 1999